Persoonia curvifolia is a plant in the family Proteaceae and is endemic to central New South Wales. It is an erect to spreading shrub with linear leaves and somewhat hairy yellow flowers.

Description
Persoonia curvifolia is an erect to spreading shrub with smooth bark and young branches and leaves that are hairy when young.

Taxonomy and naming
Persoonia curvifolia was first formally described in 1830 by Robert Brown in Supplementum primum Prodromi florae Novae Hollandiae from specimens collected near Port Jackson by "D. Cunningham".

The Wiradjuri people of New South Wales use the name bumbadula for the species.

Distribution and habitat

References

curvifolia
Flora of New South Wales
Taxa named by Robert Brown (botanist, born 1773)
Plants described in 1830